Cookshill is a small village in the civil parish of Caverswall, Staffordshire, England, near to Weston Coyney.

References

Villages in Staffordshire
Staffordshire Moorlands